A by-election was held for the Australian House of Representatives seat of Flinders on 4 December 1982. It was triggered by the resignation of the sitting member and former Liberal Party deputy leader, Sir Phillip Lynch. Fifteen people nominated for Liberal preselection, including Jim Short, Roger Johnston and Richard Alston. The Labor candidate, Rogan Ward, was a previous mayor of the former City of Frankston.

The by-election was won by Liberal Party candidate Peter Reith. Parliament was in session until 15 December, but Reith chose not to attend to be sworn in then. On 3 February 1983, before Parliament could meet following the by-election, the Prime Minister, Malcolm Fraser, called a double dissolution election for 5 March. Reith lost his seat but was re-elected at the December 1984 election.

Rogan Ward was the ALP candidate at the by-election but due to dissatisfaction with his candidacy was not again the candidate at the 1983 election. The successful ALP candidate was instead Bob Chynoweth.
Chynoweth did not face a rematch with Reith in 1984, instead successfully transferring to the seat of Dunkley.

Opponents of the Franklin Dam in Tasmania (which was eventually vetoed by the incoming Hawke Government in 1983) used the Flinders by-election as an informal referendum. 41% of Liberal voters wrote "No Dams" on their ballot-papers. This had no legal effect but did not invalidate their votes.

Results

See also
 List of Australian federal by-elections

References

1982 elections in Australia
Victorian federal by-elections
1980s in Victoria (Australia)